Andreas Vokos, better known by his nickname Miaoulis (1765 – 24 June 1835), was a Greek revolutionary, admiral, and politician who commanded Greek naval forces during the Greek War of Independence (1821–1829).

Biography
Miaoulis was born on the island of Hydra to an Arvanite family of Euboean origin, namely from the town of Fylla. He was known among his fellow islanders as a trader in corn who had gained wealth and made a popular use of his money. He had been a merchant captain, and was chosen to lead the naval forces of the islands when they rose against the government of the Sultan. Miaoulis contributed in every way possible to the cause of the resistance against the Turks. He expended the money he had made from his wheat-shipping business during the Napoleonic Wars. Between May 1825 and January 1826, Miaoulis led the Greeks to victory over the Turks in skirmishes off Modon, Cape Matapan, Suda, and Cape Papas.

Role in the Greek War of Independence
The islanders had enjoyed some measure of exemption from the worst excesses of the Turkish officials, but suffered severely from the conscription raised to man the Turkish ships; and though they seemed to be peculiarly open to attack by the Sultan's forces from the sea, they took an early and active part in the rising. As early as 1822 Miaoulis was appointed navarch, or admiral, of the swarm of small vessels which formed the insurgent fleet. He commanded the expedition sent to take revenge for the massacre of Chios in the same year. He was victorious at the Battle of Nauplia in September.In 1824, after the conquest of Psara by the Turks, he commanded the Greek forces which prevented the further progress of the Sultan's fleet, though at the cost of the loss of many fire ships and men. But in the same year he was unable to prevent the Egyptian forces from occupying Navarino, though he harassed them with some success. In 1825 he succeeded in carrying stores and reinforcements into Missolonghi, when it was besieged for the third time, though he could not avert its fall. In order to save Missolonghi, he attempted to disrupt the sea communications of the Egyptian forces. In this he failed owing to the enormous disproportion of the two squadrons in the siege and strength of the ships.

As the war went on, the naval power of the Greeks diminished, partly owing to the penury of their treasury and partly to the growth of piracy in the anarchy of the Eastern Mediterranean. He continued to be the naval chief of the Greeks until the former Royal Navy officer Thomas Cochrane entered their service in 1827. Miaoulis then retired in order to leave the British officer free to act as commander.

When Miaoulis retired to make room for Cochrane, the conduct of the struggle had really passed into the hands of the Great Powers. When independence had been obtained, Miaoulis in his old age was entangled in the civil conflicts of his country, as an opponent of Kapodistrias and the Russian Party, he seized some of the principal ships of the Greek fleet at Poros in August 1831, including the Hellas, and destroyed them during the counter-attack of the Russian fleet.

He was one of the deputation sent to invite King Otto to accept the crown of Greece, and was made rear-admiral and then vice-admiral by him. Otto also awarded him with the Grand Cross of the Order of the Redeemer.

Death and legacy 
Miaoulis died on 24 June 1835 at Athens.

He was buried in Piraeus near the tomb of Themistocles, the founder of the ancient Athenian Navy. His heart rests in an urn at the Ministry of Commercial Navy.

The Hellenic Navy named a cruiser, the Navarchos Miaoulis, after him in 1879.

His son, Athanasios, was a high-ranking military officer who served as Prime Minister of Greece between 1857 and 1862.

A big festival, called Miaoulute, takes place in Hydra every year the weekend closest to 21 June, to honor Admiral Miaoulis, a most important man of the Greek Revolution in 1821.

Gallery

References

Citations

Bibliography

Sources
 

1765 births
1835 deaths
Eastern Orthodox Christians from Greece
Greek businesspeople in shipping
Greek admirals
Greek revolutionaries
Andreas
People from Hydra (island)
Greek military leaders of the Greek War of Independence
Arvanites
English Party politicians